Marie-Thérèse Fortin (born April 14, 1959) is a Canadian actress. She has appeared in over twenty films since 1985.

Selected filmography

References

External links 

1959 births
Living people
Canadian film actresses